Yüksel Yılmaz (born 1966, İzmit, Kocaeli, Turkey) is a sijo, writer, economist, founded of JKD Kulelkavido, general president.

Jeet Kune Do is the name Bruce Lee gave to his combat philosophy and he conveys the philosophy of Jeet Kune Do in Turkey. He studied public administration at Anadolu University (faculty of economics/public administration section).

His articles about philosophy, religion, economics, literature, politics, sports, are published in local and national magazines and newspapers. Between years of 1983-1997 he was interested in politics and was given certificates of achievement by Prof. Dr. Necmettin Erbakan, the prime minister at that time. He worked as close personal body guard for Prime Minister Prof. Dr. N. Erbakan when he came to Kocaeli. He founded the Eurasia Jeet Kune Do Federation (AJKDF) in 2009. First (and Single) Official JKD Federation in Turkey (Official Federation: The Law on Associations / Law Number: 5253). He is the Jeet Kune Do Sports Club Association delegate of Istanbul. He is also vice president of the Confederation of Independent Struggle and Defense Sports.

Yüksel Yılmaz is representing Tom Keplar's Non Classical Gung Fu in  Turkey. Yüksel Yılmaz  follows in the footsteps of 2nd generation JKD man Thomas Kepler for 10 years. Basing on Bruce Lee's JKD principles he founded a martial art discipline named JKD Kulelkavido. He has many students in his country and abroad. Tom Keplar, who had taken lessons from six original students of Bruce Lee named Yüksel Yılmaz “The Father of Jeet Kune Do in Turkey” in June 2014 at a seminar in İzmit. He pioneered in the association of Jeet Kune Do Kulelkavido with Turkish Wushu Federation in August 2015. And has got the representative of this branch. Jeet Kune-Do Federation of Asia General Secretary Lion Vikas Gihara said, about his  whilst in Turkey (in March 2016): "Second Bruce Lee, living Bruce Lee."  Yüksel Yılmaz who is instructor at Kağıtsport Club of Kocaeli Municipality is instructor of Turkey Muay Thai Federation and is certificate from Prof. Dr. Sijo Sehi's Federation Internationale de Tae-Do-Kung Fu. and 32. generations Taiwanese Chuan-I Hsiao's Songshan Shaolin Temple Kung Fu and American Grand Master Antonio Desousa's International Self Defense Association (OKITAEKUNDO) Martial Arts Systems. Also Yüksel Yılmaz took instructor and representation certificates from Prof. Günther Benjamins who he is a 9. Level Ving Chun Kung Fu Instructor, Founder & President of the Ving Tsun Academy Europe, Martial Arts Health & Fitness Association. Krav Maga Academy Germany and Security Service Protection Academy, Vice President of the World Ving Tsun Athletic Association and World Ving Chun Federation, Permanent Member Ving Tsun Athletic Association / Hong Kong and Authentic Ving Tsun Association / Hong Kong and President Senior Instructor of Jeet Kune Do. Latest: Prof. Dr. Mehdi Javadi Ranjbar's World Kung Fu Wu Shu Federation (certificate of membership). Yüksel Yılmaz was also "Executive Board President" Turkey Wushu Federation in Jeet Kune Do Kulelkavido branch in November 2015. Yüksel Yılmaz is the Vice President of the World Jeet Kune Do Federation

Short films
“Forfeit of Fury” (2004)
“Fight at the Coffee Shop” (2011)

Books
“Basic Principles of Martial Arts” (2000)
“Philosophy of Jeet Kune Do” (2008)

References

Living people
1966 births